Jacek Dąbrowski (born 22 February 1974 in Otwock) is a Polish former professional footballer.

He previously played for Lechia Gdańsk, Polonia Warsaw and ŁKS Łódź in the Polish Ekstraklasa.

References

1974 births
Living people
Polish footballers
Polish expatriate footballers
Ekstraklasa players
I liga players
III liga players
Motor Lublin players
Lechia Gdańsk players
Polonia Warsaw players
Wisła Płock players
KSZO Ostrowiec Świętokrzyski players
Kallithea F.C. players
A.O. Kerkyra players
ŁKS Łomża players
ŁKS Łódź players
People from Otwock
Sportspeople from Masovian Voivodeship
Association football forwards
Polish expatriate sportspeople in Greece
Expatriate footballers in Greece